Edward Manteuffel-Szoege (born Edward Antoni Manteuffel, 5 July 1908 – 1940) was a Polish artist. He competed in the art competitions at the 1936 Summer Olympics. After the outbreak of the Second World War, Manteuffel-Szoege was arrested by the NKVD. In 1940, he was murdered by the Soviets.

References

1908 births
1940 deaths
People from Rēzekne
20th-century Polish male artists
Summer Olympics competitors for Poland
Polish civilians killed in World War II
Olympic competitors in art competitions
Polish people executed by the Soviet Union